Justyna Łukasik (born  Gdańsk) is a Polish volleyball player. She is part of the Poland women's national volleyball team.

She participated in the  2018 Montreux Volley Masters,  and 2018 FIVB Volleyball Women's Nations League.

Her younger sister Martyna is also a volleyball player.

Clubs

References

External links 
 CEV profile
 FIVB profile

1993 births
Living people
Polish women's volleyball players
Sportspeople from Gdańsk